Sidon is an ancient Phoenician city and a major modern city in Lebanon.

Sidon may also refer to:

Places
Sidon, Mississippi, U.S.
Sidon District, an administrative district in Lebanon containing the city of Sidon
Sidon Eyalet, an administrative division of the Ottoman Empire
Lordship of Sidon, a fiefdom of the Kingdom of Jerusalem
Roman Catholic Diocese of Sidon, in the Kingdom of Jerusalem in the 12th/13th centuries
River Sidon, mentioned in the Book of Mormon

Other uses
Sidon (surname), including a list of people with the name, and known as "of Sidon"
, two Royal Navy ships
Prince Sidon, a character from The Legend of Zelda: Breath of the Wild

See also

Sidonia (disambiguation)